Yevhen Mefodiyovych Kucherevskyi (6 August 1941 – 26 August 2006) was a Ukrainian football coach.  He is most famous for his spells managing Dnipro Dnipropetrovsk, which, under his helm, won the Soviet Championship in 1988, took 2nd place twice in 1987 and 1989, as well as the USSR Cup in 1989. Dnipro's recent success in the first half of the 2000s is mostly attributed to his coaching as well.

On 26 August 2006, Kucherevskyi's Mercedes-Benz suffered a head-on collision with a KAMAZ truck. The much respected coach died an hour and half later in a hospital, without regaining consciousness.

Upon Kucherevskyi's funeral, the Dnipropetrovsk mayor, Ivan Kulichenko, announced the plan to name one of the city streets to the celebrated coach.

References
 Aleksey Dospekhov, The creator of Dnipropetrovs phenomenon died, Kommersant, 28 August 2006, reprinted at Korrespondent.net in Russian and in Ukrainian. 
 Ivan Krasikov, Aleksey Dospekhov, A man who did not like to concede (obituary), Kommersant, 25 August 2006 
 Ivan Krasikov, The street in Dnipropetrovsk will be named to Kucherevsky, Kommersant, 28 August 2006 

1941 births
2006 deaths
Sportspeople from Kherson
Road incident deaths in Ukraine
FC Enerhiya Nova Kakhovka players
FC Krystal Kherson players
MFC Mykolaiv players
SC Odesa players
Soviet footballers
Ukrainian footballers
Association football goalkeepers

Soviet football managers
Merited Coaches of the Soviet Union
Ukrainian football managers
FC Elektrometalurh Nikopol managers
MFC Mykolaiv managers
FC Dnipro managers
Étoile Sportive du Sahel managers
FC Elista managers
FC Rotor Volgograd managers
FC Moscow managers
FC Arsenal Tula managers

Ukrainian expatriate football managers
Expatriate football managers in Russia
Ukrainian expatriate sportspeople in Russia
Expatriate football managers in Tunisia
Ukrainian expatriate sportspeople in Tunisia

Russian Premier League managers
Ukrainian Premier League managers
Tunisian Ligue Professionnelle 1 managers